The Arts of Fashion Foundation is a 501(c) (3), public, non-profit organization, based in San Francisco, California, established in 2001, whose focus of the foundation is the support of creativity and design in fashion and the arts linked to it. Among their projects are the International Arts of Fashion Competition, The MasterClass Series, the CarteBlanche and Debut Series (and the latter's spinoff, InvestFashion), The Tandem Series and Fashion.edu.

The Foundation, in cooperation with the Council of Fashion Designers of America, created a petition in support of the Design Piracy Prohibition Act - IDPPPA (S.3728).

External links
 Official website

References 

Arts foundations based in the United States
Organizations based in San Francisco